Chester R. Bender (March 14, 1914 – July 20, 1996) served as the fourteenth Commandant of the United States Coast Guard from 1970 to 1974. He also served as Superintendent of the United States Coast Guard Academy from 1965 to 1967.

Early life and education
Bender was born in Burnsville, West Virginia, on March 14, 1914, and later moved with his parents John I. Bender and Inez Harbert Bender, to Plant City, Florida in 1925. In 1932, he was appointed as a cadet at the United States Coast Guard Academy at New London, Connecticut. During his time at the academy, he served two years on the boxing squad and as humor editor of Tide Rips, the academy yearbook. He served as gun captain during his senior year. He graduated from the academy on June 8, 1936 and received a bachelor of science degree and a commission as a Coast Guard ensign. He was the first Floridian to graduate from the academy.

Career

Early assignments
During this tour of duty, he met and married Annamarie Ransom of Sault Sainte Marie, Michigan on September 1, 1939. Their marriage lasted until her death in 1992. They had one son, Mark A. Bender. That same year, he was selected for flight training and reported for duty at Naval Air Station Pensacola, Florida. A year later, he earned his aviator wings and was assigned to Coast Guard Air Station Elizabeth City.

World War II
During World War II, he flew anti-submarine patrols out of Elizabeth City, North Carolina. From June 1943 to December 1944, he commanded an air-rescue squadron based out of San Diego, California. During the last few months of the war, he served as air-sea rescue advisor and liaison officer for the Far East Air Force Headquarters, in the Philippines, earning the Bronze Star for his service.

Mid-career assignments
In December 1945, he was assigned to U.S. Coast Guard headquarters, as the executive officer of the Air-Sea Rescue Agency. From 1946 to 1950, he served as personal aide and pilot to  U.S. Coast Guard Commandant Joseph F. Farley. In 1950, Bender was transferred to Coast Guard Air Station St. Petersburg, Florida, where he served as executive officer. In 1953 he assumed command of the Coast Guard Air Station Traverse City, Michigan. In 1955, he returned to Coast Guard headquarters, assuming command of the War Plans Division. Three years later in 1958, he was promoted to captain and given command of the Coast Guard Air Station Barbers Point, Hawaii.

From 1961 to 1964, he served as mobilization and readiness officer for the San Francisco, California-based Western Area Command. On July 1, 1964 Bender was promoted to the rank of rear admiral and assumed command of the Cleveland, Ohio-based Ninth Coast Guard District. From 1965 to 1967, he served as superintendent of the United States Coast Guard Academy. During his tenure, he established the U.S. Coast Guard Museum in order to preserve and display artifacts from early Coast Guard history. From 1967 to 1970, he served as commander of the San Francisco-based Twelfth Coast Guard District, where he was responsible for most Coast Guard operations in the Pacific Ocean, Northern California, and most of Nevada and Utah.

Commandant of the U.S. Coast Guard
On April 16, 1970, Bender was nominated by U.S. President Richard Nixon to replace Admiral Willard J. Smith as commandant. Following Senate confirmation, he took office on June 1, 1970. During his tenure, he implemented the distinctive "Bender Blues" uniforms, designed to distinguish the U.S. Coast Guard from the U.S. Navy. In 1972, he was awarded the Coast Guard Distinguished Service Medal. As commandant, Bender was known for his support of environmental protection and was recognized for his management of the U.S. Coast Guard's programs relating to new environmental responsibilities. In 1973, he served as delegate and alternate chairman of the American delegation to the Marine Pollution Conference of the International Maritime Organization in 1973.

Later life and death
Following his retirement from the U.S. Coast Guard in 1974, Bender moved to Moraga, California. He died there on July 20, 1996 after a long illness and is buried at Arlington National Cemetery.

Awards
In addition to the Bronze Star Medal, Bender's World War II campaign medals include the America Area, American Defense, Asiatic-Pacific with two bronze stars, Philippine Liberation with two bronze stars, Philippine Presidential Unit citation, World War II Victory Medal, National Defense Service Medal, Legion of Merit, Distinguished Service Medal (two awards).

Dates of rank

Citations

References

External links
 

1914 births
1996 deaths
Commandants of the United States Coast Guard
United States Coast Guard admirals
United States Coast Guard Aviation
United States Coast Guard personnel of World War II
Recipients of the Coast Guard Distinguished Service Medal
United States Coast Guard Academy alumni
People from Burnsville, West Virginia
People from Plant City, Florida
People from Moraga, California
Burials at Arlington National Cemetery
Military personnel from California